Edgar Dearing (May 4, 1893 – August 17, 1974) was an American actor who became heavily type cast as a motorcycle cop in Hollywood films.

Biography
Born in 1893, Dearing started in silent comedy shorts for Hal Roach, including several with Laurel and Hardy, notably in their classic Two Tars, probably his best ever screen role. He later had supporting roles in several of their features for 20th Century Fox in the 1940s.

Dearing continued in his familiar persona until the early 1950s, when he appeared in many film and television westerns, usually as a sheriff. One of his guest roles was on the syndicated television series, The Range Rider, starring Jock Mahoney and Dick Jones.

He was still active in films and television until he retired in the early 1960s.

Death
He died from lung cancer.

Selected filmography

 Hot Water (1924)
 The Second Hundred Years (1927)
 Should Men Walk Home? (1927)
 Why Girls Love Sailors (1927)
 Playin' Hookey (1928)
 Should Tall Men Marry? (1928)
 Finders Keepers (1928)
 Lonesome (1928)
 Two Tars (1928)
 The Jazz Age (1929)
 Big Money (1930)
 Two Plus Fours (1930)
 Consolation Marriage (1931)
 Horse Feathers (1932)
 The Midnight Patrol (1933)
 Cleopatra (1934)
 Eskimo (1934)
 The Rainmakers (1935)
 Swing Time (1936)
 China Passage (1937)
 Nancy Steele Is Missing! (1937)
 They Gave Him a Gun (1937)
 Big City (1937)
 The Awful Truth (1937)
 When the Daltons Rode (1940)
 Cross-Country Romance (1940)
 A-Haunting We Will Go (1942)
 The Big Noise (1944)
 Scarlet Street (1945)
 Her Lucky Night (1945)
 Don't Fence Me In (1945)
 The Bishop's Wife (1947)
 The Paleface (1948)
 Samson and Delilah (1949)
 Fancy Pants (1950)
 Lightning Guns (1950)
 Pecos River (1951)
 Ridin' the Outlaw Trail (1951)
 Rancho Notorious (1952)
 It Came From Outer Space (1953)
 The Long, Long Trailer (1954) - Trailer Park Manager (uncredited)
 Ma and Pa Kettle at Home (1954) - Perkins (uncredited)
 The Long Wait (1954) - Foreman (uncredited)
 Her Twelve Men (1954) - Fire Chief (uncredited)
 Tarantula (1955) - Second Tramp (uncredited)
 Cha-Cha-Cha Boom! (1956) - Investor Charlie (uncredited)
 God Is My Partner (1957) - Mike Malone, Cop (uncredited)
 The Hired Gun (1957) - Sheriff Jenner (uncredited)
 No Name on the Bullet (1959) - Charlie - Chess Player (uncredited)
 Pollyanna (1960) - Mr. Gorman
 Ada (1961) - Politician (uncredited)

External links

1893 births
1974 deaths
Deaths from lung cancer
American male film actors
American male television actors
Hal Roach Studios actors
People from Ceres, California
Male actors from Los Angeles
Burials at Chapel of the Pines Crematory
20th-century American male actors